"Should I Stay" is a song by British singer Gabrielle. It was released as a single in 2000 and was the fourth and final single released from the Rise album. The song charted at No. 13 in the UK Singles Chart, the fourth top 15 hit from the album. The video for the single depicts a moody atmosphere rather than having a linear storyline. The song samples part of the BBC News theme. In 2004 it was used in the second episode of BBC drama serial Blackpool.

Track listings

Charts

References

2000 singles
Gabrielle (singer) songs
1999 songs
Go! Beat singles
Universal Records singles
Songs written by Gabrielle (singer)
Song recordings produced by Jonny Dollar